This is a list of municipalities of Sweden after the division at the turn of the year of 2011–12. There are 290 municipalities.

All statistics are from 1 January 2013, except for population (30 September 2013) and density (1 January 2013 and 30 September 2013).

Code refers to the municipality code, Total area includes seawater area and Inland water area excludes the four largest lakes in Sweden (Vänern, Vättern, Mälaren and Hjälmaren).

List

References
 Folkmängd i riket, län och kommuner 30 september 2013 och befolkningsförändringar 1 juli - 30 september 2013 . Statistics Sweden.
 Land- och vattenareal per den 1 januari efter region och arealtyp. År 2012 - 2013 . Statistics Sweden.

See also
 List of urban areas in Sweden

 
Demographics of Sweden